Richard Alan Parker (born March 20, 1963) is a former Major League Baseball outfielder. He played all or part of six seasons in the majors between 1990-96 for the San Francisco Giants (1990–91), Houston Astros (1993), New York Mets (1994), and Los Angeles Dodgers (1995–96). His professional career spanned fourteen seasons, from 1985 to 1998.

Parker played college baseball for the University of Texas at Austin. He was originally drafted in the 16th round of the 1985 draft by the Philadelphia Phillies, and played in their minor league system for four-plus seasons. He was traded to the Giants in 1989 as the player to be named later in an earlier deal for Steve Bedrosian, and made his major league debut less than a year later. He was released by the Giants after the 1991 season, then spent the rest of his career as a journeyman without ever playing a full season in the majors. He finished his playing career with the Norfolk Tides in the Mets organization.

References

External links

Major League Baseball outfielders
Los Angeles Dodgers players
San Francisco Giants players
New York Mets players
Houston Astros players
Bend Phillies players
Clearwater Phillies players
Spartanburg Phillies players
Phoenix Firebirds players
Reading Phillies players
Tucson Toros players
Norfolk Tides players
Albuquerque Dukes players
Texas Longhorns baseball players
Baseball players from Kansas City, Missouri
Living people
1963 births